Fomitopsis mounceae is a species of shelf fungus. Originally thought to be identical to the red-belted conk, studies show that it is in fact a discrete species. The original specimen was isolated from Edson, Alberta on a poplar tree. This species was named after Irene Mounce, a Canadian mycologist.

It causes cubical brown rot typical of Fomitopsis, and favours aspen or coniferous trees. It is a detritivore, and does not typically grow on live trees. It typically grows at lower elevations than its close relative, F. schrenkii.

Description
Fomitopsis mounceae is a perennial woody conk distributed across Canada and the northern United States, down to northern California. It is typically fan-like in shape, with distinct bands usually brown or red in colour. It can have a resinous, sticky coating. As the conks age, they often become bumpy or warty. The underside of the conk is typically white or yellow in colour, with 3–6 round pores per millimetre. If broken open, the inside is woody and brown, with no distinct bands. It stains brown in KOH.

References

mounceae
Fungi of Canada
Fungi of the United States
Fungi described in 2019
Fungi without expected TNC conservation status